Chenar (also Romanized as Chenār; also known as Darreh Chenār) is a village in Dorud Rural District, in the Central District of Dorud County, Lorestan Province, Iran. At the 2006 census, its population was 239, in 44 families.

References 

Towns and villages in Dorud County